Sunyani Municipal District is one of the twelve districts in Bono Region, Ghana. Originally created as an ordinary district assembly on 10 March 1989 when it was known as Sunyani District, until the northwest part of the district was split off to create Sunyani West District on 1 November 2007 (effectively 29 February 2008); thus the remaining part has been retained as Sunyani District, which it was later elevated to municipal district assembly status and has been renamed as Sunyani Municipal District on that same year. The municipality is located in the western part of Bono Region and has Sunyani as its capital town.

List of settlements

Sources
 
 District: Sunyani Municipal District

References

Districts of Bono Region